Priya Thomas is a Canadian musician, dancer, choreographer, and scholar. She has released work under her own name and under the pseudonym, Iroquois Falls. She has toured with John Cale, The Fall, James, Radiohead, Sam Philips, the Neville Brothers and Rufus Wainwright, among others.

She teaches and practices ashtanga yoga in Toronto.

Musical career

Thomas was born in Hamilton, Ontario, and raised in Montreal. Her first instrument was the violin and started writing music at the age of 11.

Thomas trained as a dancer under Priyamvada Sankar in Montreal. Thomas performed her arangetram in 1983 and continued to study Bharata Natyam with Sankar until 1995, performing regularly in Canada, the US and India. Thomas also studied Carnatic vocal music and Sanskrit with Priyamvada Sankar. Thomas has choreographed and performed in contemporary dance pieces, most notably collaborating with Hari Krishnan and Devraj Patnaik, co-founder of Chitralekha Odissi Dance Creations, on a piece commissioned by Dusk Dances. 

Thomas earned a B.A in Religious Studies from McGill University, and an M.A from York University. She is currently completing a Ph.D in Dance Studies at York University.

Thomas released her first solo record In the Throes of the Microscope in 1996. Following its release, Thomas relocated to Toronto where she wrote the experimental Armageddon Weather Channel, which was recorded with contributions from Ian Ilavsky. The was well received by critics, but lacked distribution and radioplay.

Songs for Car Commercials was released in 2002. You and Me Against the World Baby, released in 2006. In 2008, Priya Thomas is Blood Heron (Renovation Tracks) was released by Sunny Lane Records to critical acclaim in the U.S. and Canada.

Following the loss of her close friend John Michael Auden McVey to suicide in March 2009, Thomas returned to movement work and choreographic practices.

In 2012, Thomas formed an experimental project called Iroquois Falls. An EP entitled Twice-Born-Once-From-A-Gun was released by Toronto label Hi-Scores on March 21, 2012.

Discography
 1996: In The Throes of the Microscope
 1998: Armageddon Weather Channel
 2003: Songs for Car Commercials
 2006: You and Me Against the World Baby
 2008: Priya Thomas is Blood Heron
 2012: Twice-Born-Once-From-A-Gun EP

References

Sources
 Wheeler, Brad.  Disc of the Week: Priya Thomas is Blood Heron; Renovations Still Raw but the Place Shows Well The Globe and Mail, November 11, 2008.
 Adams, Bill. Priya Thomas is Blood Heron (renovation tracks) Review Ground Control L.A, September 2008.
 Bliss, Karen.  Ten Years On Priya Thomas is Still Writing Evocative, Provocative Songs Words and Music Socan, January 2006.
 Berkeley Place. Priya Thomas - Blood Heron Review November 2008.
 Adams, Bill Priya Thomas: The Virtue of Living and Working in the Moment Ground Control Magazine, October 2008.
 Chart Attack Staff Priya Thomas is Blood Heron September, 2008.
 Lewis, Jason  Priya Thomas is Blood Heron FFWD Weekly Calgary, October 23, 2008.
 Guimond, Steve Priya Thomas is Blood Heron CD Review The Hour Montreal, January 2009.
 Sakamoto, John Priya Thomas Blood Heron, Anti-Hit List The Toronto Star, September 2008.
 Morgan, Jeffrey Priya Thomas is Blood Heron, Jeffrey Morgan's Media Blackout The Detroit Metro Times, November 11, 2008.
 McCabe, Daniel.  Doubting Thomas Elle Magazine interview Elle Magazine, August 2006.
 Saxberg, Lynn.  Music Enigma Refuses to Conform: Artist Finding Success Doing Her Own Thing Ottawa Citizen, October 20, 2002.
 Marsolais, Patrick.  Au Coeur de la Tempete Le Voir, Montreal. June 5, 1996.
 Lepage, Mark. Don't Call Priya Thomas a Folkie: Montreal Guitarist Writes, Sings with Anger and Urgency The Montreal Gazette, May 1996.
 Yurkiw, Chris.  Priya Thomas, Crisis? What Crisis? The Montreal Mirror, May 30, 1996.
 O'Meara, Jamie.  Priya Thomas: In the Throes of the Microscope, Top Pick May 30, 1996.

External links
 Official site
 Iroquois Falls Hi-Scores site
 Priya Thomas on Itunes
  Priya Thomas Digital Journal, The Yoga Examiner
 Iroquois Falls Bandcamp

Living people
Year of birth missing (living people)
Canadian women singer-songwriters
Canadian women singers
McGill University alumni
Musicians from Hamilton, Ontario
Musicians from Toronto
York University alumni
Canadian people of Syrian descent
Canadian alternative rock musicians